Huh Chin-kyu (born December 1, 1940) is a billionaire South Korean businessman, and the founder and chairman of ILJIN Group.

Early life
Huh was born on December 1, 1940, in Buan, North Jeolla Province during Japanese rule over Korea.  He earned a bachelor's degree in material sciences and engineering from Seoul National University.

Career
Huh founded ILJIN Electricity Industry Inc. in 1967.

In July 2018, his net worth was estimated at US$1.1 billion.

Huh is the vice chairman of the Korea International Trade Association. He has an honorary doctorate from Cheon-Book University.

Personal life
His eldest son Huh Jung-suk joined Iljin Group in 2002 as a director and became the president and CEO of Iljin Holdings in 2007, and is the co-CEO of Iljin Electric. His second-eldest son, Huh Jae-myung, is president and CEO of Iljin Copper Foil.

References

Living people
1940s births
South Korean billionaires
South Korean company founders
Seoul National University alumni